The Ora Tour was the first concert tour by British singer Rita Ora, in support of her debut studio album, Ora (2012). The mini-concert tour started on 23 October 2012 in the Yost Theater in Santa Ana, and ended on 17 December 2012 in the Highline Ballroom in New York City.

Opening acts

Iggy Azalea
Havana Brown

Setlist
This set list is representative of the show on October 24, 2012. It does not represent all concerts for the duration of the tour.
"Facemelt"
"Roc the Life"
"Fall in Love"
"Shine Ya Light"
"Swim Good"
"How We Do (Party)"
"Radioactive"
"R.I.P."
"Uneasy"

Tour dates

Notes

References 

Rita Ora concert tours
2012 concert tours